Lorenzo D'Ercole (born 11 February 1988) is an Italian professional basketball player, who last played for Derthona Basket of the Italian Serie A2 Basket, second tier national championship.

Professional career
On 1 June 2020, D'Ercole signed a one-year contract with Reyer Venezia. At mid-season, on February 17, 2021, he moved to Derthona Basket in the Italian Serie A2 Basket, second tier national championship.

International career
The Italian started in the under age categories of Italy, first for the Under 16's at the 2004 European Championship and then notably winning the bronze medal with the U20's at the 2007 European Championship.
He made his debut with the senior men's national team during the 2009 Mediterranean Games, in which Italy was ranked fourth after losing the bronze medal game.

Career statistics

EuroLeague

|-
| style="text-align:left;"| 2009–10
| style="text-align:left;"| Siena
| 3 || 0 || 5.5 || .0 || .500 || .0 || .0 || .0 || .0 || .0 || 2.0 || 1.0
|-
| style="text-align:left;"| 2015–16
| style="text-align:left;"| Sassari
| 8 || 0 || 9.5 || .333 || .111 || .0 || .6 || .3 || .3 || .0 || .6 || .3
|- class="sortbottom"
|colspan=2 style="text-align:center;"| Career
| 11 || 0 || 8.6 || .333 || .231 || .0 || .2 || .2 || .6 || .0 || 1.0 || .454

Awards and honors

Team
Serie A champion: 2007, 2010
Italian Cup winner: 2010
Italian Supercup winner: 2009

International
European Under-20 Championship
2007 Italy

Individual
 2× Serie A All-Star: 2011, 2012

References

External links
Lega Basket Serie A profile  
Euroleague profile

1988 births
Living people
Dinamo Sassari players
Italian men's basketball players
Lega Basket Serie A players
Mens Sana Basket players
Montecatiniterme Basketball players
Pallacanestro Virtus Roma players
Pallalcesto Amatori Udine players
Pistoia Basket 2000 players
Shooting guards
S.S. Felice Scandone players
Vanoli Cremona players
Competitors at the 2009 Mediterranean Games
Mediterranean Games competitors for Italy